Tayemeh (also Romanized as Ţāyemeh, Ţā’emeh, and Ţāīmeh; also known as Somāq and Thaimāq) is a village in Tariq ol Eslam Rural District, in the Central District of Nahavand County, Hamadan Province, Iran. At the 2006 census, its population was 673, in 162 families.

References 

Populated places in Nahavand County